Mont d'Amin (1,417 m) is a mountain of the Jura, located east of the Vue des Alpes in the canton of Neuchâtel. It lies on the range between the valleys of Saint-Imier and Val-de-Ruz.

References

External links
Mont d'Amin on Hikr

Mountains of the Jura
Mountains of the canton of Neuchâtel
Mountains of Switzerland
One-thousanders of Switzerland